Rae Bareli is a constituency of the Uttar Pradesh Legislative Assembly covering the city of Rae Bareli in the Rae Bareli district of Uttar Pradesh, India.

Rae Bareli (रायबरेली) is one of five assembly constituencies in the Rae Bareli Lok Sabha constituency. Since 2008, this assembly constituency is numbered 180 amongst 403 constituencies.

Currently this seat belongs to Aditi Singh who won in last Assembly election of 2017 Uttar Pradesh Legislative Elections, as Congress candidate, defeating Bahujan Samaj Party candidate Shabaj Khan by a margin of more than 90,000 votes. In May 2020, Aditi Singh was suspended from Congress Party for indiscipline amidst rumours that she was getting close to BJP. In November 2021 Aditi Singh officially joined BJP.

Vidhan Sabha Members

Election results

2022 Elections
 Aditi Singh (BJP) : 101,974 votes    
 Ram Pratap Yadav (Samajwadi Party) : 94294 votes

2017 Elections
 Aditi Singh (Congress) : 128,319 ( 62.95%) votes
 Mhd Shahbaz Khan (BSP) : 39,156 (19.21%) votes
 Anita Srivastava (BJP) : 28,821 (14.14%) votes

2012 Elections
 Akhilesh Kumar Singh (Peace Party) :  75,588 votes. 
 Ram Pratap Yadav(RP) (SP)  :  46,094 votes.

1967 Elections
 M. M. Misra (INC) : 24,422 votes. 
 J. Prasad (BJS) : 6,999 votes.

References

External links
 

Raebareli
Assembly constituencies of Uttar Pradesh